The affair of Fielding and Bylandt was a brief naval engagement off the Isle of Wight on 31 December 1779 between a Royal Navy squadron, commanded by Commodore Charles Fielding, and a naval squadron of the Dutch Republic, commanded by rear-admiral Lodewijk van Bylandt, escorting a Dutch convoy. The Dutch and British were not yet at war, but the British wished to inspect the Dutch merchantmen for what they considered contraband destined for France, then engaged in the American War of Independence.

Bylandt attempted to avoid the engagement by offering to allow the British to inspect the ships' manifests, but when Fielding insisted on a physical inspection, Bylandt put up a brief show of force, before striking his colours. The British squadron then seized the Dutch merchantmen and took them as prizes to Portsmouth, followed by the Dutch squadron. The incident worsened the already strained diplomatic relations between Great Britain and the Dutch Republic. It also contributed to the formation of the First League of Armed Neutrality to which the Dutch acceded in December of 1780. As a result of secret Dutch support of the American rebels, Britain declared the Fourth Anglo-Dutch War shortly afterwards.

Background
The Dutch Republic had, after a period of strife during the second half of the seventeenth century, become a steadfast ally of the Kingdom of Great Britain, initially (after the Glorious Revolution of 1688) as the senior partner in the alliance, but later in the eighteenth century as the increasingly junior partner. The Dutch had signed a number of treaties of military alliance with the British (notably those of 1678, 1689 and 1716) which obliged it to offer armed support in case the British requested it.  On the other hand, it had obtained in the Treaty of Breda and its offshoot, the Commercial Treaty of 1668 (confirmed in the Treaty of Westminster) an important concession from England: the right to transport non-contraband goods in its ships to countries with which Britain was at war, without these goods being subject to seizure by Britain even if they were owned by subjects of belligerent powers (this was usually referred to as the principle of "free ship, free goods").  The concept "contraband" was narrowly defined in these treaties as "arms and munitions."  So-called "naval stores" (by which were commonly understood: ship's timbers, masts and spars, rope, canvas, tar and pitch) were not to be considered contraband.  This right became important during wars in which Britain was a participant, but the Republic remained neutral, like the Seven Years' War and after 1778 the American Revolutionary War, in which Britain opposed the rebelling American colonies and their allies, France and Spain.  Arguably it exempted Dutch bottoms from inspection by the Royal Navy (or at least from confiscation of the goods in British prize courts), thereby undermining Britain's ability to maintain an effective embargo on the trade of her enemies, especially because Dutch shipping at the time still played a major role in the European carrying trade.

Though public opinion in the Republic became more and more sympathetic to the American Revolution in the years after 1776, the Dutch government that was dominated by stadtholder William V and his autocratic regime, who were inclined against supporting the Americans.  However, the highly federalized structure of the Republic prevented the central government from effectively interfering with the commerce of cities like Amsterdam, which conducted a highly profitable trade with the American rebels (exchanging arms and munitions for colonial wares, like tobacco) via the entrepôt of the Dutch West India Company in its colony of St. Eustatius. The Amsterdam merchants also supplied France with naval stores, which that country needed for its naval construction, but was unable to procure itself in Norway and the Baltic countries, due to the British blockade. The Republic as a neutral power was therefore very useful for the French and their war effort. Britain, of course, viewed these developments with disfavour, and lobbied the Dutch government to put a end to them. Diplomatic means failed, however. The Republic refused to provide military assistance in the form of the "loan" of its mercenary Scottish Brigade, when Britain requested that brigade for service in America. It also (reluctantly) provided shelter in Dutch territorial waters for the squadron of the American privateer John Paul Jones in 1779, and refused to embargo the export of arms and munitions. These refusals were due to the influence of Amsterdam, but also to diplomatic counter-pressure of France, exerted by its highly able ambassador Paul François de Quelen de la Vauguyon. When diplomatic means did not suffice, the Royal Navy resorted increasingly to seizure of what it considered "contraband" in Dutch bottoms on the high seas. This elicited considerable protest from the affected merchants, for which the Dutch government at first ignored completely. France then started to exert pressure on the Dutch government to "defend its treaty rights" by selectively imposing economic sanctions on the Dutch cities that supported the stadtholder in his opposition to taking countermeasures against the seizures. This soon convinced those cities to fall in line with Amsterdam and start clamouring for escort by Dutch naval vessels of convoys of merchantmen.

The States-General of the Netherlands (the governing body of the Republic) changed its position in November, 1779 and ordered the stadtholder, in his quality of commander-in-chief of the Dutch armed forces, to start offering limited convoy services to Dutch shipping. This despite the fact that the Dutch navy, because of long neglect, had become only a shadow of its former self. The 20 ships of the line that were not too old to serve, were no match for the larger Royal Navy ships armed with 90 or 80 guns. According to  the Dutch historian De Jonge the Royal Navy at the time had 137 ships of the line and France 68. After much discussion the States-General had decided on a programme of naval construction in 1778. Twenty-four new ships of the line were to be built, but this programme progressed only slowly, mainly because only the province of Holland paid its share of the cost. None of the new ships were as yet available. This did not bode well for a future naval conflict between the Republic and Great Britain and may help explain a certain lack of enthusiasm in the Dutch navy to engage in such a conflict. Though the Republic did not concede the British interpretation of the Commercial Treaty that naval stores were to be considered  contraband after all, the stadtholder prevailed in his policy of nevertheless excluding such stores from the convoys, to minimize friction with the British.

The incident
When the first convoys were prepared in December 1779 (one to the West Indies, under Rear-Admiral Willem Crul, and another to France and the Mediterranean under Rear-Admiral Count Lodewijk van Bylandt), the stadtholder gave written instructions that these should exclude ships that transported naval stores (as he at the time understood that the British defined those: in essence ships' timbers).  He also prohibited allowing ships from "nations not recognized by the Republic" (i.e. the ships of John Paul Jones) to become part of the convoys. Finally, he enjoined Bylandt to avoid anything that might jeopardize the neutrality of the Republic.

The squadron of Admiral Bylandt departed from the Texel on 27 December 1779. It consisted of his flagship, the 54-gun ship of the line Prinses Royal Frederika Sophia Maria, the 40-gun Argo (Captain Jan Hendrik van Kinsbergen), the 44-gun Zwieten (Captain Nauman), the 26-gunValk (Captain Silvester) and the 26-gun Alarm (Captain Mulder). They escorted 17 Dutch merchantmen. After progressing calmly a few days through the English Channel the convoy encountered a British squadron in the morning of 30 December. Courageux hailed the Dutch flagship and asked for a parley to which Bylandt agreed. Fielding then sent a boat with two parlimentaires, one of which was his flag captain Marshall. Marshall demanded Bylandt's acquiescence in a physical inspection of the Dutch merchantmen by the British.

Bylandt replied that such a request was unprecedented as in peacetime the bona fides of the naval escorts of the convoy were usually accepted when the commanding officer asserted on his word of honour that the convoy did not transport contraband.  He produced the manifests of the ships in the convoy and sworn statements of the captains of the merchantmen that they did not transport contraband, and added that he had personally satisfied himself that the convoy did not contain ship's timbers, though the Dutch did not consider this contraband.  Marshall asked whether the ships carried hemp or iron (he apparently was well informed) and Bylandt admitted that they did and that this had never been considered contraband.  Marshall replied that according to his new orders these particular commodities now constituted contraband.  Seeing that Marshall was refusing to budge to his demands, Bylandt then sent his own flag captain, his nephew Frederik Sigismond van Bylandt, to the Namur to negotiate directly with Fielding.  This too failed to produce agreement.  Fielding announced that he would start searching the Dutch vessels the next morning (as night had now fallen) and the younger Bylandt replied that in that case the Dutch would open fire.

During the night twelve of the Dutch merchantmen managed to slip away so that the next morning the convoy only consisted of the remaining five.  Fielding now closed in with three of his ships of the line (Namur and two 74s) but was blocked by Bylandt with Prinses Royal, Argo and the frigate Alarm (the other two Dutch ships were out of reach).  Nevertheless, Namur sent a launch to one of the Dutch merchantmen and Prinses Royal then fired two shots across its bow to make it veer away.  About what happened next the British and Dutch versions differ.  According to Bylandt and his captains in their depositions under oath during his court martial the three British ships immediately replied with a broadside, to which the Dutch ships replied with one broadside of their own.  According to Fielding he fired a single shot, which was answered by a broadside, to which the British answered with broadsides of their own.

After this exchange of fire Bylandt immediately struck his colours and signalled the other Dutch ships to do the same.  This was remarkable, as the Dutch standing orders explicitly prohibited Dutch ships from surrendering if they were still capable of fighting, even when the flagship surrendered.  It transpired at Bylandt's court martial that he had given sealed orders to his captains before departure from the Texel that they had to surrender when he gave a designated signal.  He later explained that he had written these secret orders, because he foresaw that he would be confronted with an overwhelming superiority in numbers and guns, against which resistance would be useless.  He had decided to offer only token resistance in such a case, just enough to "satisfy honour", but that it was imperative to restrain his captains of undue displays of aggressiveness in such a case, as that would defeat his purpose of avoiding needless conflict.

This was a typical example of eighteenth-century warfare that, more than modern warfare, was aimed at avoiding needless casualties.  The British interpreted the striking of the colours as it was intended: to break off the fight and not as an actual surrender.  They made no attempt to board the Dutch warships.  Fielding proceeded with his inspection of the five merchantmen and duly arrested them when he found the contraband in question, bales of hemp being stashed in the hold. He then sent a message to Bylandt allowing him to rehoist his colours and proceed on his way. Bylandt replied, however, that he would stay with the merchantmen. Fielding then demanded that the Dutch warships would salute the White Ensign as he was entitled to under the several Anglo-Dutch treaties. Normally the Dutch did not object to this procedure, but in this case Bylandt hesitated. However, to avoid the possibility of starting an engagement in which his fleet was outmatched, and because he wished to carefully observe the treaties, Bylandt complied with this demand. Dutch public opinion would later hold it against him. Finally, the British sailed with their prizes to Portsmouth, followed into port by Bylandt, who sent a complaint to the Dutch ambassador in Britain, count Van Welderen, as soon as he arrived.

Aftermath

Dutch public opinion was incensed, both by the inspection and by what they considered Bylandt's pusillanimity, that in the view of many amounted to cowardice, if not treason. To defend his honour Bylandt then demanded a court martial to clear his name. This blue-ribbon panel, consisting of no less than seven admirals, soon acquitted him of all charges brought against him though his secret surrender orders required some suppleness of mind in explaining them away. However, the prosecutor delivered a statement for the prosecution that might easily have been taken for a statement for the defence, thereby giving a strong impression of a whitewash to contemporaries (though not to sympathetic historians like De Jonge). Many even suspected that Bylandt's conduct was the result of a conspiracy by the stadtholder to avoid supporting the Americans.

As a consequence of the political unrest, the stadtholder had to cease his resistance to unlimited convoy. The Dutch would henceforth try to defend their full treaty rights, to the satisfaction of France, which suspended its economic sanctions. The British, on the other hand, ceased all pretence of respecting those treaty rights. In April, 1780 the British abrogated the Commercial Treaty of 1668, and declared that they would henceforth treat the Dutch like any other neutral nation in the conflict, and refrain from continuing to grant the Dutch the "free ship, free goods" rights they had previously enjoyed. Meanwhile, however, Empress Catherine II of Russia, shocked by the incident and even more by a similar incident involving some Spanish merchantmen by two Russian warships, decided to issue a manifesto in which she demanded respect of the "free ship, free goods" principle for all neutrals by the belligerents. France and Spain were quick to comply (Spain issued abject apologies), but the British government demurred: the declaration was mainly aimed at the Royal Navy. Catherine then started negotiations with other neutral powers, including the Republic, to form what was to become the (First) League of Armed Neutrality.

The Republic saw an opportunity in it to protect itself from the Royal Navy seizures of its trade without having to join the war against Great Britain. However, the Dutch overplayed their hand by asking for a guarantee of their colonies by the other members of the League. This Catherine was loath to grant. Eventually the Dutch settled for what was on offer and joined the League in December, 1780. The British then negated this gambit by declaring war on the Dutch for their secret support of the American rebels, thereby providing the other members of the League with an excuse to withhold their armed assistance to the Dutch. The Fourth Anglo-Dutch War had started.

Notes and citations
Notes

Citations

Sources

 (2001; repr. 1911 ed.) The Dutch Republic and The American Revolution. University Press of the Pacific, 
 (1919) The American Revolution
  (1869) Geschiedenis van het Nederlandsche Zeewezen (third edition)

American Revolutionary War
Diplomacy during the American Revolutionary War
Military history of the Netherlands
1779 in Great Britain
1770s in the Dutch Republic
1779 in international relations